Randolph Wilbert Staten, Sr. (January 24, 1944 – May 29, 2020) was an American politician and football player.

Staten served in the Minnesota House of Representatives from 1981 to 1987 and was a Democrat. He was the only African-American to be elected to the Minnesota Legislature in 1980. Staten was tried and convicted for writing bad checks and for shoplifting in 1985 and 1987.

Background
He was previously an American football defensive end. He played for the New York Giants in 1967.

Staten was born in Charlotte, North Carolina and graduated from Second Ward High School in Charlotte in 1962. He received his bachelor's degree in speech and advance communications from University of Minnesota. Staten went to New York University to graduate school for business management. Staten lived in Minneapolis and was a businessman.

He died on May 29, 2020, in Charlotte, North Carolina, at age 76.

References

1944 births
2020 deaths
African-American state legislators in Minnesota
Businesspeople from Minneapolis
Politicians from Minneapolis
Politicians from Charlotte, North Carolina
New York University alumni
Players of American football from Charlotte, North Carolina
American football defensive ends
Minnesota Golden Gophers football players
New York Giants players
Democratic Party members of the Minnesota House of Representatives
Minnesota politicians convicted of crimes